The 1982 KB Cup was the 9th edition of the NSWRFL Midweek Cup, a NSWRFL-organised national club Rugby League tournament between the leading clubs and representative teams from the NSWRFL, the BRL, the CRL, the QRL and the NZRL.

A total of 18 teams from across Australia and New Zealand played 24 matches in a round-robin format with teams playing a round of games with the 2 lowest performing teams being eliminated before the remaining teams played another round of games with the top 8 teams advanced to a knockout stage, with the matches being held midweek during the premiership season.

Qualified Teams

Venues

Round 1

Canterbury-Bankstown and Illawarra eliminated.

Round 2

The original second round draw saw Cronulla-Sutherland play Canterbury-Bankstown and Canberra play Illawarra. That was amended because under the competition guidelines, the 2 teams that were placed last after round 1 were eliminated. The amended draw is listed below.

Quarter finals

Semi finals

 *- Progressed on penalty count-back

Final

Named Teams:

Manly-Warringah:  1.Graham Eadie, 2. John Ribot, 3. Phil Blake, 4. Michael Blake, 5. Simon Booth, 6. Alan Thompson, 7. Mike Eden, 8. Bruce Walker, 9. Les Boyd, 10. Paul McCabe, 11. Mark Broadhurst, 12. Max Krilich (c), 13. Geoff Gerard. Res – 14. Paul Vautin, 15. Chris Close, 16. Ray Brown, 17. Ian Thomson. Coach – Ray Ritchie.

Newtown: 1. Phil Sigsworth, 2. John Ferguson, 3. Mick Ryan, 4. Allan McMahon, 5. Mal Graham, 6. Dean Lance, 7. Tom Raudonikis, 8. Graeme O'Grady, 9. Mick Pitman, 10. Col Murphy, 11. Craig Ellis, 12. Mark Bugden, 13. Steve Bowden. Res - 14. Ken Wilson, 15. Ron Sigsworth, 16. Peter Kelly, 17. John Mackay. Coach - Warren Ryan.

Manly-Warringah 23 (Ribot, P.Blake, M.Blake, Booth tries, Eden 4, Eadie goals, Eden field goal) d Newtown 8 (Graham, Lance tries, Wilson goal). Crowd: 14,490.

Player of the Series
 Mike Eden (Manly-Warringah)

Golden Try
 Phil Blake (Manly-Warringah)

References

Sources
 http://www.rugbyleagueproject.org/

1982
1982 in Australian rugby league
1982 in New Zealand rugby league